BC Prievidza is a professional basketball club based in playing in Prievidza, Slovakia. The team plays in the Slovak Extraliga. The club plays home games in the sports hall Niké Arena.

History 
The team was founded in 1947 under the name Sokol Prievizda. In 1989 the club won its first ever title in the Czechoslovak Championship. Prievizda won another title four years later (1993), which was also the last edition of the Czechoslovak Championship. In a separate Slovak top division, the club won its first title in the 1993–94 season. After relegation to the second division in 2004, the club renamed as the Hornonitriansky Basketball Club (HBK) Prievidza. From August 2009 the club is called BC Prievidza. In 2011–12 and 2015–16, Prievidza won the Slovak Championship.

Names 
1947–1952 Sokol Prievidza
1952–1953 Carpathia Prievidza
1953–1957 Tatran Prievidza
1957–1964 Lokomotíva Prievidza
1964–2004 Baník Cígeľ Prievidza
2004–2009 HBK Prievidza
2009-present BC Prievidza

Honours

Domestic competitions 
Czechoslovak Championship
Winners (2): 1989, 1993
Slovak Championship
Winners (4): 1994, 1995, 2012, 2016

Season by season

European competitions 
Prievidza saw its first action in Europe, in the 1989–90 season, when it competed at the FIBA European Champions Cup. Prievidza won in the first round against Täby Basket, but was defeated by FC Barcelona in the Round of 16.

Players

Current roster

Notable players

References 

Basketball teams established in 1947
Basketball teams in Slovakia
Sport in Trenčín Region
Prievidza District
1947 establishments in Czechoslovakia
Basketball in Czechoslovakia